Outlaw Country is a 2012 American television film directed by Adam Arkin and Michael Dinner and starring Mary Steenburgen and John Hawkes.  It was intended to be a television pilot but the series was not picked up.

Premise
A crime thriller and family drama set against the backdrop of southern organized crime and Nashville royalty, where music, love, hope and tragedy collide.

Cast
Mary Steenburgen as Anastasia Lee
Luke Grimes as Eli Larkin
Haley Bennett as Annabel Lee
John Hawkes as Tarzen Larkin 
Frank Hoyt Taylor as Jackman Folcum
John-Paul Howard as Jonny
Ron Prather as Sheriff Boyle
Jim O'Rear as Deputy Sheriff Reese
Todd Bush as Deputy Sheriff
Johnny Whitworth as Ajax
Marc Allen as Deputy Sheriff
Bruce McKinnon as Trevor

References

External links
 

2012 television films
2012 films
2012 crime drama films
2012 crime thriller films
2012 thriller drama films
2010s English-language films
American crime drama films
American crime thriller films
American thriller drama films
American thriller television films
Crime television films
Country music films
American drama television films
Films directed by Adam Arkin
Films set in Nashville, Tennessee
FX Networks original films
Television pilots not picked up as a series
2010s American films
Films directed by Michael Dinner